Steve Nagy may refer to:
 Steve Nagy (baseball)
 Steve Nagy (bowler)